The Schoellkopf Power Station was built on land owned by Jacob F. Schoellkopf above the Niagara Gorge near the American Falls,  downriver from Rainbow Bridge. Understanding the growing need for electricity and the role of harnessing the Falls, Schoellkopf purchased the land for the hydraulic canal on May 1, 1877 for $71,000.  After Schoellkopf Sr.'s death in 1903, his sons took over the operation of the power business. In 1918, Schoellkopf's Niagara Falls Hydraulic Power and Manufacturing Company merged with the Niagara Falls Power Company, which was owned by Edward Dean Adams. Much of the site is, as of 2014, occupied by the Maid of the Mist tour boat company as a maintenance area and off-season boat storage yard. The power station remains form a part of a fully accessible tourist attraction associated with Niagara Falls State Park and is connected with its Niagara Gorge hiking trail system.

Station No. 1
In 1853 construction of a "Hydraulic Canal" was begun, intended to bring water from the Niagara River above the falls to the river bluff below the falls. The original 1874 plant did not produce electricity but used water turbines to power belts and drive shafts for nearby mills. In 1882 Schoellkopf partnered with Charles Brush who had come to Niagara Falls with a dynamo and 16 carbon arc lights which were used on the streets of Niagara Falls, New York. The  first dynamo had a capacity of 1,800 horsepower and ran up to 1904 when it was abandoned in favor of Station No. 2. it was also known as the Quigley Pulp - Lower Mill and the Cliff Paper - Lower Mill.

Station No. 2
In 1898 a second much larger hydroelectric plant was built at the base of the bluff, immediately in front of Schoellkopf's original 1874 plant, and reached a capacity of 34,000 hp before being shut down in 1921.

Station No. 3
Station No. 3a was completed by 1914 and housed 13 10,000-hp turbines. Station No. 3b
began construction in 1918 and contained three generators totaling 112,500 hp. Station No. 3c
was completed by 1924 with a capacity of 210,000 hp. As the old hydraulic canal was already operating at capacity a new tunnel was constructed to supply the new station.

Collapse
On June 7, 1956, water began seeping into the back of the plant from the wall built against the bluff, causing the wall to crack. At 5 p.m. that day, Station No. 3c and then Station No. 3b flooded and collapsed into the Niagara River, destroying two thirds of the plant and the six generators that produced more than 300,000 horsepower. The grid lost 400,000 kilowatts of power and damage was estimated at $100m. The remains of the Plant either toppled into the gorge or were razed soon after. Station 3A was damaged, but remained in operation at reduced volume until 1961. The collapse led to the passage of the 1957 Niagara Redevelopment Act.

Station No. 3a was demolished in 1962 as part of Robert Moses's work to beautify the American side of the Falls. The energy lost by the 1956 collapse was replaced by the Robert Moses Niagara Power Plant, which was commissioned in 1961. The only permanently extant part of the Schoellkopf site is the stone wall (known as Power Station No. 3), which was built during beautification efforts in 1908-10. That wall was listed on the National Register of Historic Places in February 2013. However, depending on the seasonal flow of the River, it's sometimes possible to see the twisted steel girders and even a generator turbine that fell into the River.

See also
 List of hydroelectric power station failures

References

External links

Archaeological sites on the National Register of Historic Places in New York (state)
Buildings and structures in Niagara Falls, New York
Schoellkopf family
National Register of Historic Places in Niagara County, New York